This is a list of episodes of the South Korean variety-music show King of Mask Singer in 2019. The show airs on MBC as part of their Sunday Night lineup. The names listed below are in performance order.

 – Contestant is instantly eliminated by the live audience and judging panel
 – After being eliminated, contestant performs a prepared song for the next round and takes off their mask during the instrumental break
 – After being eliminated and revealing their identity, contestant has another special performance.
 – Contestant advances to the next round.
 – Contestant becomes the challenger.
 – Mask King.

Episodes

93rd Generation Mask King

Contestants: Yoon Ji-sung (Wanna One), HerCheck, Shin Seung-hee (Take), Sujeong (Lovelyz), Chae Yeon, 

Episode 185

Episode 185 was broadcast on January 6, 2019. This marks the beginning of the Ninety-third Generation.

Episode 186

Episode 186 was broadcast on January 13, 2019.

As part of the show's launch in the United States, a judge on that version performed, in disguise to open this episode.  The United States version debuted on 2 January 2019.

94th Generation Mask King

Episode 187

Episode 187 was broadcast on January 20, 2019. This marks the beginning of the Ninety-fourth Generation.

Episode 188

Episode 188 was broadcast on January 27, 2019.

95th Generation Mask King (Seollal Idol Special)

Contestants: Inseong (SF9), Park Hyun-gyu (Vromance), Yeonjung (Cosmic Girls), Ji Su-yeon (Weki Meki), Rockhyun (100%), Haena, Jinho (Pentagon), Hyojin (ONF)

Episode 189

Episode 189 was broadcast on February 3, 2019. This marks the beginning of the Ninety-fifth Generation. This also starts the special episodes for Seollal, with the contestants are the main vocals of eight South Korean idol groups.

Episode 190

Episode 190 was broadcast on February 10, 2019.

Episode 191

Episode 191 was broadcast on February 17, 2019. The first half of this episode is the last part of Seollal Idol Special.

96th Generation Mask King

Episode 191

Episode 191 was broadcast on February 17, 2019. The second half of this episode marks the beginning of the Ninety-sixth Generation.

Episode 192

Episode 192 was broadcast on February 24, 2019.

Episode 193

Episode 193 was broadcast on March 3, 2019.

97th Generation Mask King

Episode 193

Episode 193 was broadcast on March 3, 2019. The second half of this episode marks the beginning of the Ninety-seventh Generation.

Episode 194

Episode 194 was broadcast on March 10, 2019.

98th Generation Mask King

Contestants: Y (Golden Child), Kim Ju-na, Jeong So-yeon (Laboum), Jang Gyu-ri (Fromis 9), Jo Bin (Norazo), Lee Won-seok (Daybreak), Choi Song-hyun

Episode 195

Episode 195 was broadcast on March 17, 2019. This marks the beginning of the Ninety-eighth Generation.

Episode 196

Episode 196 was broadcast on March 24, 2019.

99th Generation Mask King

Contestants: Giant Pink, Alex (Clazziquai), Han (Stray Kids), Lee Min-kyung (Diva), Sejeong (Gugudan), Song Geon-hee

Episode 197

Episode 197 was broadcast on March 31, 2019. This marks the beginning of the Ninety-ninth Generation.

Episode 198

Episode 198 was broadcast on April 7, 2019.

100th Generation Mask King

Contestants: Lee Seung-hyub (N.Flying), Yoo Seung-woo, Ha Jin, Woo Won-jae, Bong Jung-geun, Hong Kyung-min

Episode 199

Episode 199 was broadcast on April 14, 2019. This marks the beginning of the Hundredth Generation.

Episode 200

Episode 200 was broadcast on April 21, 2019.

101st Generation Mask King

Contestants: Park Si-eun, Kassy, Jun Hyo-seong, Bobby Kim, U-Kwon (Block B)

Episode 201

Episode 201 was broadcast on April 28, 2019. This marks the beginning of the Hundred-first Generation.

Episode 202

Episode 202 was broadcast on May 5, 2019.

102nd Generation Mask King

Contestants: Choi Hyo-in, Kwangho (Voisper), Yoo Young-jae, Ahin (Momoland), Kang Shin-il, Car, the Garden

Episode 203

Episode 203 was broadcast on May 12, 2019. This marks the beginning of the Hundred-second Generation.

Episode 204

Episode 204 was broadcast on May 19, 2019.

103rd Generation Mask King

Contestants: , Chaekyung (April), Jung Ha-na, Park Jae-jung, Yoon Joo-bin, Young K (Day6), Lee Bo-ram (SeeYa), Jang Dong-min

Episode 205

Episode 205 was broadcast on May 26, 2019. This marks the beginning of the Hundred-third Generation.

Episode 206

Episode 206 was broadcast on June 2, 2019.

104th Generation Mask King

Contestants: Song Ga-in, Kim Sung-soo (Cool), Won Heum (Norazo), Seunghee (Oh My Girl), JK Kim Dong-wook, Takuya Terada

Episode 207

Episode 207 was broadcast on June 9, 2019. This marks the beginning of the Hundred-fourth Generation.

Episode 208

Episode 208 was broadcast on June 16, 2019.

105th Generation Mask King

Contestants: Sunday (The Grace), Siyeon (Dreamcatcher), Doyoung (NCT), Jasson, Hangzoo (Rhythm Power), Kim Jang-hoon, No Min-woo

Episode 209

Episode 209 was broadcast on June 23, 2019. This marks the beginning of the Hundred-fifth Generation.

Episode 210

Episode 210 was postponed one week because of the 2019 Koreas–United States DMZ Summit news coverage, and broadcast on July 7, 2019.

106th Generation Mask King

Contestants: Oh Jin-sung, Sangil (Snuper), Rothy, Kyuhyun (Super Junior), Kim Bo-yeon, Bae Seul-ki

Episode 211

Episode 211 was broadcast on July 14, 2019. This marks the beginning of the Hundred-sixth Generation.

Episode 212

Episode 212 was broadcast on July 21, 2019.

107th Generation Mask King

Contestants: Kim Young-woo (Sweet Sorrow), Hyun Jin-young, NC.A, Byun Jung-soo, MJ (Astro)

Episode 213

Episode 213 was broadcast on July 28, 2019. This marks the beginning of the Hundred-seventh Generation.

Episode 214

Episode 214 was broadcast on August 4, 2019.

108th Generation Mask King

Contestants: Jeong Jun-ha, Park Seong-ho, Tae Jin-ah,  (Limitless), Jeong Inseong (KNK), Kang Deok-in (Jang Deok Cheol)

Episode 215

Episode 215 was broadcast on August 11, 2019. This marks the beginning of the Hundred-eighth Generation.

Episode 216

Episode 216 was broadcast on August 18, 2019.

109th Generation Mask King

Episode 217

Episode 217 was broadcast on August 25, 2019. This marks the beginning of the Hundred-ninth Generation.

Episode 218

Episode 218 was broadcast on September 1, 2019.

110th Generation Mask King

Contestants: Kim Jung-hyun, Tiffany (Girls' Generation), Sung Jin-hwan (Sweet Sorrow), Mijoo (Lovelyz), Kwon Hyun-bin

Episode 219

Episode 219 was broadcast on September 8, 2019. This marks the beginning of the Hundred-tenth Generation.

Episode 220

Episode 220 was broadcast on September 15, 2019.

111th Generation Mask King

Contestants: Shin Ji (Koyote), Younghoon (The Boyz), Lee Won-il, Lee Seok-hoon (SG Wannabe), 

Episode 221

Episode 221 was broadcast on September 22, 2019. This marks the beginning of the Hundred-eleventh Generation.

Episode 222

Episode 222 was broadcast on September 29, 2019.

112th Generation Mask King

Contestants: , Eli Kim, Roh Ji-hoon, Lee Ah-hyun, Eru, Yujin (CLC)

Episode 223

Episode 223 was broadcast on October 6, 2019. This marks the beginning of the Hundred-twelfth Generation.

Episode 224

Episode 224 was broadcast on October 13, 2019.

113th Generation Mask King

Contestants: Kang Se-jung, Woo Jin-young (D1ce), Choiza (Dynamic Duo), Joo Young-hoon, Bbaek Ga (Koyote), Wendy (Red Velvet)

Episode 225

Episode 225 was broadcast on October 20, 2019. This marks the beginning of the Hundred-thirteenth Generation.

Episode 226

Episode 226 was broadcast on October 27, 2019.

114th Generation Mask King

Contestants: Lee Se-eun, Wonpil (Day6), Kim Bo-hee (Mono), Kim Woo-ri, Yerin (GFriend), 

Episode 227

Episode 227 was broadcast on November 3, 2019. This marks the beginning of the Hundred-fourteenth Generation.

Episode 228

Episode 228 was broadcast on November 10, 2019.

115th Generation Mask King

Episode 229

Episode 229 was broadcast on November 17, 2019. This marks the beginning of the Hundred-fifteenth Generation.

Episode 230

Episode 230 was broadcast on November 24, 2019.

116th Generation Mask King

Contestants: Soobin (Cosmic Girls), Kwak Yoon-gy, Lee Min-gyu, Vinxen, J-Us (ONF), Lee Seung-woo, Soya

Episode 231

Episode 231 was broadcast on December 1, 2019. This marks the beginning of the Hundred-sixteenth Generation.

Episode 232

Episode 232 was broadcast on December 8, 2019.

117th Generation Mask King

Contestants: Hyuk (VIXX), Yeo One (Pentagon), Son Tae-jin (Forte di Quattro), Lee Seung-hwan (1the9), So Chan-whee, Yein (Lovelyz)

Episode 233

Episode 233 was broadcast on December 15, 2019. This marks the beginning of the Hundred-seventeenth Generation.

Episode 234

Episode 234 was broadcast on December 22, 2019.

118th Generation Mask King

Episode 235 was broadcast on December 29, 2019. This marks the beginning of the Hundred-eighteenth Generation.

References 

Lists of King of Mask Singer episodes
Lists of variety television series episodes
Lists of South Korean television series episodes
2019 in South Korean television